3/13/98 Cedar Cultural Centre is a live album released by the rock n' roll jam band, The Big Wu. It was recorded at the Cedar Cultural Center in Minneapolis on March 13, 1998.

Track listing

Disc 1 (acoustic set) 
  "Bill Kubecszko Intro" 
  "Dark Hollow" 
  "City Of New Orleans, The" 
  "On The Road Again" 
  "All Around The World" 
  "Dreadful Wind & Rain" 
  "Diamond Joe" 
  "Take The World By Storm" 
  "Last Train" 
  "House Of Wu" 
  "Elani" 
  "Precious Hands" 
  "Bird On The Wing" 
  "Kensington Manor"

Disc two
  "Minnesota Moon" 
  "Mister Charlie" 
  "Ballad Of Dan Toe, The" 
  "Tangled Up In Blue" 
  "Silcanturnitova" 
  "Good Lovin'" 
  "...To High!" 
  "Dark Star" 
  "Two Person Chair"

Disc three
  "Kangaroo" 
  "Gimme A Raise" 
  "S.O.S." – (with Kashmir Jam) 
  "Werewolves Of London" 
  "Red Sky"

References

2001 live albums
The Big Wu albums